Ardizas is a commune in the Gers department in southwestern France.

Geography 
Ardizas is located in the canton of Gimone-Arrats and in the arrondissement of Condom.

Population

See also
Communes of the Gers department

References

Communes of Gers